The Devil's Messenger is a 1961 anthology horror film combining 3 episodes of the 1959 B&W Swedish television series 13 Demon Street (which was never broadcast in the USA) with some new scenes featuring Lon Chaney Jr., Karen Kadler and John Crawford. This "feature version" of the series is the closest the U.S. came to seeing the TV series in the U.S. (although the entire series is now available on DVD in the territory).

The film includes stories about a 50,000-year-old woman found frozen in an ice field, a man's death foretold in dreams, and Satan's plans to blow up the Earth with atomic weapons.

Plot summary

Cast
 Lon Chaney Jr. as Satan (as Lon Chaney)
 Karen Kadler as Satanya
 Michael Hinn as John Radian
 Ralph Brown as Charlie (archive footage)
 John Crawford as Donald Powell (archive footage)
 Bert Johnson as (archive footage)
 Frank Taylor as Dr. Ben Seastrom (archive footage) (as Bert Johnson)
 Chalmers Goodlin as Dr. Hume (archive footage)
 Gunnel Broström as Madame Germaine (archive footage) (as Gunnel Brostrom)
 Sara Harts as Angelica - Frozen Girl (archive footage) (as Tammy Newmara)
 Jan Blomberg as J. D. Younger
 Inga Botorp as Dixie (archive footage) (as Ingrid Bedoya)
 Eve Hossner as Girl in Photograph (archive footage)

References

External links 
 
 
 
 
 

1961 films
1961 horror films
American black-and-white films
American supernatural horror films
American horror anthology films
Films directed by Herbert L. Strock
The Devil in film
Films based on television series
1960s English-language films
1960s American films